Alexandra Louise Bastian (born 27 February 1982) is an English actress, known for her roles as Becca Dean in the Channel 4 soap opera Hollyoaks, Sally Armstrong in the ITV drama series The Bill and Becky Clarke in the BBC soap opera Doctors. She has also competed in the seventh series of Strictly Come Dancing.

Career
Bastian was signed to Storm Models, and has worked for Littlewoods within a new range called Drama Queens. Bastian joined the Channel 4 soap opera Hollyoaks in 2001 as Becca Dean. She was involved in a controversial storyline where her character was fired from her teaching job and sent to prison after having an affair with one of her students. In December 2005, alongside her Hollyoaks cast mates Jodi Albert and Sarah Jayne Dunn, she appeared in an exercise video, Hollyoaks Get Fit. At the 2006 British Soap Awards, Bastian and Chris Fountain won the award for Best Storyline. She departed from the series in 2007. Bastian then appeared on television in Cavegirl, A Touch of Frost, Twenty Four 7, and Here After.

Bastian joined the long-running ITV police drama The Bill as PC Sally Armstrong in 2007, and departed in late 2009. In 2009, Bastian was a contestant on the seventh series of Strictly Come Dancing, departing in the semi-final, where she was partnered with Brian Fortuna. In week 11, she severely bruised the bones of her foot while training, but the medical team gave her the all clear to go ahead and perform. Bastian and Fortuna finished in third place out of sixteen couples. The pair danced again in the Strictly Come Dancing Christmas Special in 2009 and won, having scored 40/40 for their Viennese waltz.

In 2011, Bastian starred in the UK touring version of Bill Kenwright's production of Verdict by Agatha Christie, playing alter-ego Helen Rollander. In late 2018, it was announced that Bastian had joined the cast of the BBC daytime soap opera Doctors as Becky Clarke. Her first episode as Becky aired on 5 February 2019. Bastian made an unannounced departure from Doctors in the episode broadcast on 6 November 2019 and confirmed after the episode had aired that she had left the series.

Personal life
Bastian became engaged to musician Tom Clay in 2013. In February 2019, she married actor David O'Mahony. In October 2019, she announced she was pregnant with their first child, and as a result, left the cast of Doctors. Bastian  explained that she had made the decision to leave Doctors to reduce her workload so that she could concentrate on getting pregnant in real life. She felt that her body "was crying out for a break" and said that her exit had helped her to conceive a baby. On 17 March 2020, she announced the birth of their daughter. In October 2022, she announced that she is pregnant with her second child. On 16 February 2023, she announced the birth of their second daughter.

Filmography

Stage

References

External links 

 

1982 births
20th-century English actresses
21st-century English actresses
Actresses from Berkshire
English soap opera actresses
English television actresses
Living people
People from Windsor, Berkshire